An n-pointed magic star is a star polygon with Schläfli symbol {n/2} in which numbers are placed at each of the n vertices and n intersections, such that the four numbers on each line sum to the same magic constant. A normal magic star contains the integers from 1 to 2n with no numbers repeated. The magic constant of an n-pointed normal magic star is M = 4n + 2.

No star polygons with fewer than 5 points exist, and the construction of a normal 5-pointed magic star turns out to be impossible. It can be proven that there exists no 4-pointed star that will satisfy the conditions here. The smallest examples of normal magic stars are therefore 6-pointed. Some examples are given below. Notice that for specific values of n, the n-pointed magic stars are also known as magic hexagrams (n = 6), magic heptagrams (n = 7), etc.

See also
Magic square

References

External links
Marian Trenkler's Magic Stars
Gianni Sarcone's Magic Star

Magic shapes
Star symbols